The Dennery River is the river on the southern end of the fishing village of Dennery on the island of Saint Lucia. The community of Dennery is built on its flood plain and in recent times has been the cause of serious flooding in the coastal community. It drains into the Atlantic Ocean.

Hazards
It has been advised that all human contact with the water should be avoided as it is hazardous to health. The water is polluted and full of bacteria causing potential harm.

See also
List of rivers of Saint Lucia

References

Rivers of Saint Lucia